Seraphim Records is the sister label of Angel Records.

History
During the 1960s through the 1980s, it was Angel's low-price label; recordings that had originally been released on the Angel label were re-released at a bargain price on the Seraphim label. The very first release was of stereophonic recordings by Sir Thomas Beecham and the Royal Philharmonic Orchestra, including several pieces previously unreleased.

The label has specialized in historic recordings, including some originally released on 78-rpm discs.  In 1967, Seraphim issued some of the 1937–39 recordings by Arturo Toscanini and the BBC Symphony Orchestra.  Some opera recordings were released, including Pietro Mascagni's historic 1940 recording of his opera Cavalleria rusticana, complete with the original spoken introduction (in Italian) by the composer.

EMI used the label for CDs consisting of re-released music recorded during the LP era, primarily in stereo. Some early digital recordings were also reissued on the label.

EMI's classical-music operations were sold to Warner Music Group in 2013 after its dismantling by Universal Music. The status of which company owns Seraphim is now unknown.

See also
 List of record labels
 Angel Records

1960s establishments in the United States
1980s disestablishments in the United States
EMI
American record labels
Classical music record labels